Charles or Charlie Thompson may refer to:

Arts and entertainment
 Charles Thompson (jazz) (1918–2016), American jazz musician also known as "Sir Charles"
 Charles Hubbard Thompson (1891–1964), American ragtime musician
 Charles P. Thompson (1891–1979), American actor
 Charles S. Thompson (set decorator) (1908–1994), Hollywood art designer
 Charles Thurston Thompson (1816–1868), British photographer
 Black Francis (Charles Thompson IV, born 1965), American musician, frontman of the alternative rock band Pixies

Politics
 Charles Thompson (Cherokee chief) (died 1891), (Cherokee name Oochalata), Principal Chief of the Cherokee Nation
 Charles Collins Thompson (1898–1983), Texas judge, attorney, banker and rancher
 Charles E. Thompson (1889–1986), member of the Mississippi Senate
 Charles Edwin Thompson (1890–1966), Canadian politician
 Charles H. Thompson (Wisconsin official) (1935–2012), Secretary of the Wisconsin Department of Transportation 1987–1991
 Charles H. Thompson (Illinois judge) (1882–1972), Chief Justice of the Illinois Supreme Court in 1945, 1946, 1949, and 1950
 Charles J. Thompson (1862–1932), US Representative from Ohio
 Charles Perkins Thompson (1827–1894), US Representative from Massachusetts
 Tommy Thompson (Royal Navy officer) (Charles Ralfe Thompson, 1894–1966), British naval officer and Prime Ministerial aide-de-camp
 Charles Winston Thompson (1860–1904), US Representative from Alabama
 Charles W. Thompson (Kansas politician) (1867–1950), Lieutenant Governor of Kansas
 Mike Thompson (California politician) (Charles Michael Thompson, born 1951), US representative from California

Sports
 Charles Thompson (American football) (born 1968), former quarterback of the Oklahoma Sooners
 Charles Thompson (athlete) (1921–?), Guyanaese Olympic sprinter
 Charles Thompson (rugby union) (1874–?), British rugby union player
 Charles Meysey-Thompson (1849–1881), footballer who played for Wanderers
 Charlie Thompson (footballer, born 1909) (1909–1979), English footballer
 Charlie Thompson (footballer, born 1920) (1920–1997), English footballer
 Charlie Thompson (rugby union)  (c. 1896–c. 1965), rugby union player who represented Australia
 Charlie Thompson (American football) (1894–1949), college football player and high school football coach
 Chuck Thompson (1921–2005), American sportscaster

Other
 Charles Thompson (engraver) (1791–1843), English wood-engraver in France
 Sir Charles Thompson, 1st Baronet (c. 1740–1799), British admiral
 Charles A. Thompson (1843–1900), American Union Army soldier and Medal of Honor recipient
 Charles B. Thompson (1814–1895), leader of a Latter Day Saint schismatic group in Missouri and Iowa
 Charles C. Thompson (born 1961), bishop of the Catholic Church in the United States
 Charles C. Thompson II, American writer, author of A Glimpse of Hell
 Charles F. Thompson (1882–1954), United States Army general
 Charles Henry Thompson (1896–1980), first African American to obtain a doctoral degree in educational psychology
 Charles L. Thompson (1868–1959), American architect
 Charles J. S. Thompson (1862–1943), British physician and writer
 Charles S. Thompson (ornithologist) (1881–1960), American ornithologist
 Charles Stewart Thompson (1851–1900), medical missionary in India
 Charles Victor Thompson (born 1970), American murderer
 Charlie Thompson (reporter), American journalist

See also
 Charles Thomson (disambiguation)